Substance may refer to:
 Matter, anything that has mass and takes up space

Chemistry
 Chemical substance, a material with a definite chemical composition
 Drug substance
 Substance abuse, drug-related healthcare and social policy diagnosis or label
 Substance dependence, drug-related healthcare and social policy diagnosis or label

Arts, entertainment, and media

Music
 Substance (Blank & Jones album), 2002
 Substance (Joy Division album), 1988
 Substance 1987, a New Order album
 "Substance", a song by Haste the Day on the album That They May Know You
 "Substance" (song), a 2022 song by Demi Lovato

Other media
 SubStance, an interdisciplinary journal on literature published by the University of Wisconsin Press
 Metal Gear Solid 2: Substance, an update of the video game Metal Gear Solid 2: Sons of Liberty

Religion and philosophy
 Dravya, a term used in Jainism to refer a substance
 Ousia, term for substance in ancient Greek philosophy and Christian theology
 Substance theory, an ontological theory positing that a substance is distinct from its properties

See also
 Substance control (disambiguation)
 Substantial (rapper)